Tyreek or Tyreke is a given name. Notable people with the name include:

Tyreek Burwell (born 1992), American football player
Tyreek Duren (born 1991), American basketball player
Tyreke Evans (born 1989), American basketball player
Tyreek Hill (born 1994), American football player
Tyreke Johnson (born 1998), English footballer
Tyreke Smith (born 2000), American football player

See also
Tyree (disambiguation), includes list of people with given name Tyree